William Nicholas may refer to:

 William Nicholas (officer) (1785–1812), English officer in the British Army
 William H. Nicholas (1892–1984), American politician who served twice as the Lieutenant Governor of Iowa

See also 

 William Nicholas Darnell (1776–1865), English cleric, academic and antiquarian
 William Nicholas Searancke (1817–1904), New Zealand surveyor, land purchase commissioner, resident magistrate and land agent
 William Nicholas Keogh (1817–1878), Irish politician and judge
 William Nicholas Hailmann (1836-1920), American educator
 William Nicholas Selig (1864–1948), American film pioneer
 William Nicholas Willis (1858–1922), Australian politician
 William Nicholas Stone Courtney (1929–2011), British actor
 William Nicholas Straub House, historic house in Arkansas